The GMA Dove Awards Song of the Year is one of the two main categories (along with Songwriter of the Year) which have been given since the 1st GMA Dove Awards in 1969. The following is a list of the winning songs and the songwriter(s) who received the award.

Recipients 

Sources

References and notes

External links
 Dove Awards website

GMA Dove Awards
Song awards